The National Basketball League Rookie of the Year Award was an annual National Basketball League (NBL) award given to the top rookie(s) of the regular season in each of the twelve years the league existed. The Rookie of the Year was selected by sports writers, broadcasters, coaches, and managers. Despite the dozens of teams that played in the NBL through its history, three of them collectively dominated the award's recipients. The Indianapolis Kautskys and Sheboygan Red Skins had three winners each, while the Akron Goodyear Wingfoots had two, for a combined eight of the twelve awards bestowed (66.7%).

Among the winners were two future Basketball Hall of Famers, Red Holzman (1986) and Dolph Schayes (1973).

Winners

See also
 NBA Rookie of the Year Award

References

Rookie
Awards established in 1938
1938 establishments in the United States